Li Xin (Chinese: 李鑫; born 5 November 1991 in Shenyang, Liaoning) is a Chinese football player who currently plays for China League Two side Shanghai Jiading Huilong.

Club career
In 2010, Li Xin started his professional footballer career with Harbin Yiteng in the China League Two. In the 2011 China League Two campaign he would be part of the team that won the division and promotion into the second tier. He would go on to be a member of the squad as they moved up divisions and gained promotion to the Chinese Super League. He would eventually make his Super league debut for Harbin on 15 March 2014 in a game against Guangzhou Evergrande, coming on as a substitute for Han Deming in the 73rd minute in a 4-1 defeat. 

In July 2017, Li was loaned to China League Two club Jilin Baijia until 31 December 2017. This move would be made permanent the following season until on 24 January 2019, Li transferred to fellow League Two side Qingdao Jonoon.

Career statistics 
Statistics accurate as of match played 31 December 2020.

Honours

Club
Harbin Yiteng
 China League Two: 2011

References

External links
LI XIN at Soccerway.com

1991 births
Living people
Chinese footballers
Footballers from Shenyang
Zhejiang Yiteng F.C. players
Qingdao Hainiu F.C. (1990) players
Chinese Super League players
China League One players
Association football midfielders